The Golden Globe Awards  are accolades bestowed by the Hollywood Foreign Press Association starting in January 1944, recognizing excellence in both American and international film and television.  Beginning in 2022, there are 105 members of the HFPA. 

The annual ceremony at which the awards are presented is normally held every January and has been a major part of the film industry's awards season, which culminates each year in the Academy Awards, although the Golden Globes' relevance has been declining in recent years. The eligibility period for the Golden Globes corresponds to the calendar year (from January 1 through December 31).

History
The Hollywood Foreign Press Association (HFPA) was founded in 1943 by Los Angeles-based foreign journalists seeking to develop a better organized process of gathering and distributing cinema news to non-U.S. markets. One of the organization's first major endeavors was to establish a ceremony similar to the Academy Awards to honor film achievements. The 1st Golden Globe Awards, honoring the best achievements in 1943 filmmaking, were held in January 1944, at the 20th Century-Fox studios. Subsequent ceremonies were held at various venues throughout the next decade, including the Beverly Hills Hotel and the Hollywood Roosevelt Hotel.

In 1950, the HFPA established a special honorary award to recognize outstanding contributions to the entertainment industry. Recognizing its subject as an international figure within the entertainment industry, the first award was presented to director and producer Cecil B. DeMille. The official name of the award thus became the Cecil B. DeMille Award.

The 13th Golden Globe Awards held in February 1956 saw the first Golden Globe in Television Achievement. The first three permanent television award categories, Best TV Series, Best TV Actor, and Best TV Actress, then made their debuts during the 19th Golden Globe Awards held in March 1962.

Beginning in 1963, the trophies commenced to be handed out by one or more persons referred to as "Miss Golden Globe", a title renamed on January 5, 2018, to "Golden Globe Ambassador". The holders of the position were, traditionally, the daughters or sometimes the sons of a celebrity, and as a point of pride, these often continued to be contested among celebrity parents.

In 2009, the Golden Globe statuette was redesigned (but not for the first time in its history). The New York firm Society Awards collaborated for a year with the HFPA to produce a statuette that included a unique marble and enhanced the statuette's quality and gold content. It was unveiled at a press conference at the Beverly Hilton prior to the show.

The Carol Burnett Award was created as a television counterpart to the Cecil B. DeMille Award, named after its first recipient in 2019, actress and comedian Carol Burnett.

Revenues generated from the annual ceremony have enabled the HFPA to donate millions of dollars to entertainment-related charities, as well as funding scholarships and other programs for future film and television professionals. The most prominent beneficiary is the Young Artist Awards, presented annually by the Young Artist Foundation, established in 1978 by Hollywood Foreign Press member Maureen Dragone, to recognize and award excellence of young Hollywood performers under the age of 21 and to provide scholarships for young artists who may be physically or financially challenged.

Rules

Eligibility
The qualifying eligibility period for all nominations is the calendar year from January 1 through December 31.

Voice-over performances and cameo appearances in which persons play themselves are not eligible from all of the film and TV acting categories.

Films must be at least 70 minutes and released for at least a seven-day run in the Greater Los Angeles area, starting prior to midnight on December 31. Films can be released in theaters, on pay-per-view, or by digital delivery.

For the Best Foreign Language Film category, films do not need to be released in the United States. At least 51 percent of the dialogue must be in a language other than English, and they must first be released in their country of origin during a 14-month period from November 1 to December 31 prior to the Awards. However, if a film was not released in its country of origin due to censorship, it can still qualify if it had a one-week release in the United States during the qualifying calendar year. There is no limit to the number of submitted films from a given country.

A TV program must air in the United States between the prime time hours of 8 p.m. and 11 p.m (or 7 p.m. and 11 p.m on Sundays). A show can air on broadcast television, on basic or premium cable, or by digital delivery; it does not qualify if it is only on pay-per-view or via digital delivery of film. Also, a TV show must either be made in the United States or be a co-production financially and creatively between an American and a foreign production company. Furthermore, reality and non-scripted shows are disqualified.

A film cannot be entered in both the film and TV categories, and instead should be entered based on its original release format. If it was first aired on American television, then it can be entered into the TV categories. If it was released in theaters or on pay-per-view, then it should instead be entered into the film categories. A film festival showing does not count towards disqualifying what would otherwise be a TV program.

Actors in a TV series must appear in at least six episodes during the qualifying calendar year. Actors in a TV film or miniseries must appear in at least five percent of the time in that TV film or miniseries.

Screening requirements
Active HFPA members need to be invited to an official screening of each eligible film directly by its respective distributor or publicist. The screening must take place in the Greater Los Angeles area, either before the film's release or up to one week afterwards. The screening can be a regular screening in a theater with the public or a press screening; it does not need to be an HFPA member-only event. The screening must also be cleared with the Motion Picture Association so there are no scheduling conflicts with other official screenings.

For TV programs, they must merely be available to be seen by HFPA members in any common format, including the original TV broadcast.

Nominations and voting
Entry forms for films need to be received by the HFPA within ten days of the official screening. TV programs should be submitted "as early as possible" before the deadline.

As part of their regular journalistic jobs, active HFPA members will participate in covering the press conferences, and interviewing cast members, of selected films and TV programs. The film press conferences need to take place either before the film's release in the Greater Los Angeles area or up to one week afterwards.

Ballots to select the nominations are sent to HFPA members in November, along with a "Reminder List" of eligible film and TV programs. Each HFPA member then votes for their top five choices in each category, numbering them 5 to 1, with 5 being their top choice. The nominees in each category are then the five selections that receive the most votes. The ranked voting is only used to break ties, with number 5 worth 5 points, number 4 worth 4 points, and so on.

After the nominations are announced in mid-December, HFPA members receive the final ballots. The winner in each category is selected from among the nominees by plurality voting. In case of a tie, the winner is the one that had the most votes on the nomination ballot.

Comparison of award shows

Ceremony

The broadcast of the Golden Globe Awards, telecast to 167 countries worldwide, generally ranks as the third most-watched awards show each year, behind only the Oscars and the Grammy Awards. Since 2010, it was televised live in all United States time zones. Until Ricky Gervais hosted in 2010, the award ceremony was one of two major Hollywood award ceremonies (the other being the Screen Actors Guild Awards) that did not have a regular host; every year a different presenter introduced the ceremony at the beginning of the broadcast. Gervais returned to host the 68th and 69th Golden Globe Awards the next two years. Tina Fey and Amy Poehler hosted the 70th, 71st and 72nd Golden Globe Awards in 2013 through 2015. The Golden Globe Awards' theme song, which debuted in 2012, was written by Japanese musician and songwriter Yoshiki Hayashi.

2008 disruption
Due to threats of writers picketing the event as part of the ongoing Writers Guild of America strike, the 65th Golden Globe Awards ceremony was cancelled and replaced by an hour-long press conference to announce the winners. While NBC, who normally airs the ceremony, was initially intended to be the exclusive broadcaster of the press conference, the network faced conflicts with the HFPA and Dick Clark Productions over the plan. The HFPA subsequently announced that it would not restrict coverage of the press conference by other broadcasters.

E! (several years before the NBCUniversal merger) and TV Guide Network (who were typically known for red carpet coverage from major awards shows) both aired coverage of the press conference, as well as CNN. NBC declined to air the conference itself; the ceremony timeslot was filled by a Dateline NBC preview special, an hour-long results special hosted by Access Hollywoods Billy Bush and Nancy O'Dell, and an Access Hollywood post-show also hosted by Bush and O'Dell.

Broadcasting 
The HFPA has had a lucrative contract with NBC for decades, which began broadcasting the award ceremony locally in Los Angeles in 1958, then nationally in 1964. However, in 1968, the Federal Communications Commission claimed the show "misled the public as to how the winners were determined" (allegations included that winners were determined by lobby; to motivate winners to show up to the awards ceremony winners were informed if they did not attend another winner would be named). The FCC admonished NBC for participating in the scandal. Subsequently, NBC refused to broadcast the ceremony from 1968 until after 1974.

Since 1993, Dick Clark Productions (DCP) has produced the ceremony with NBC as a broadcaster; DCP's involvement came at a time of instability for the Golden Globes, including reduced credibility and having lost its contract with CBS (the interim period saw it contract with cable network TBS to air the ceremony). Enthusiastic over Clark's commitment, the HFPA's contract contained an unusual provision granting Dick Clark Productions the role of producer in perpetuity, as long as it continued to maintain broadcast rights with NBC.

In 2010, Dick Clark Productions reached an extension with NBC through 2018. However, the deal was negotiated without the HFPA's knowledge. The HFPA sued DCP over the deal, as well as claims that the company was attempting to sell digital rights that it did not hold; the HFPA had wanted a new contract that would grant them a larger share of revenue from the telecast.

In April 2012, judge Howard Matz upheld the NBC perpetuity clause and ruled in favor of DCP, noting that the HFPA had a history of "unbusinesslike display[s] of misplaced priorities" and "[succumbing] to bouts of pronounced turmoil and personal feuds", in contrast to DCP, which had been "represented by one experienced executive who was adept at dealing fairly and effectively with the often amateurish conduct of HFPA." Matz pointed out examples of the HFPA's enthusiasm over the relationship and their desire to "not get cancelled", such as having disregarded its own bylaws by approving an extension in 2001 without a formal vote. The case was taken to the Ninth Circuit Court of Appeals.

In 2014, Dick Clark Productions and the HFPA reached a settlement; details were not released, but DCP committed to continue its role as producer through at least the end of its current contract with NBC, and to work with the HFPA to "expand the brand with unique and exciting entertainment experiences". NBC held a right of first refusal to renew its contract beyond 2018, but bidding was to be open to other broadcasters; in September 2018, NBC agreed to renew its rights to the Golden Globes through 2027, maintaining the current broadcast arrangement and the involvement of Dick Clark Productions.

In 2019 and 2020, NBC televised the late Sunday afternoon National Football League (NFL) playoff game (which had historically gone to another NFL broadcaster) as a lead-in to the Golden Globes. Because of the large viewership of NFL playoff games, this was intended to boost the Golden Globes' TV ratings, which dropped 11% between 2017 and 2018. If the game ever went long, NBC planned to still air the Golden Globes in its entirety on a broadcast delay.

2022 boycott

In 2021, the HFPA faced criticism for the lack of Black representation among its members. On May 3, 2021, the HFPA announced plans for a reform package, including a 50% increase in members over the next 18 months. However, Time's Up and a group of 100 PR firms criticized the lack of given timelines for filling some of the new management positions, arguing that they would not be completed soon enough to have any material impact on the cycle of the upcoming 79th Golden Globe Awards in January 2022. Time's Up further argued that the package "largely contains no specifics" nor "commitments to real accountability or change".

On May 7, 2021, both Amazon Studios and Netflix announced that they would stop their activities with the HFPA until sufficient actions on reforms are made. Other media companies followed suit on May 10, including NBC, who announced that it would not televise the 2022 ceremony, but that it would be open to televising the ceremony in 2023 if the HFPA were successful in its efforts to reform. Following these events, the HFPA released a timeline for its reforms, which would see the process completed by the week of August 2. On October 1, the HFPA released a list of 21 new members that it had recruited under these reforms. The HFPA then announced on October 15 that it still plans to hold the 79th Golden Globe Awards anyway on January 9, 2022, with or without another telecast partner. With the televised absence of the Golden Globe Awards from NBC, the Critics Choice Association attempted to shift their Critics' Choice Movie Awards ceremony up a week in order to fill the void and increase their overall prestige, though it was later delayed due to the outbreak of the COVID-19 Omicron variant. The 2022 ceremony was untelevised.

In July 2022, the HFPA approved a major restructuring, under which interim CEO Todd Boehly agreed to establish a for-profit entity via his holding company Eldridge Industries (owner of ceremony producer Dick Clark Productions, as well as the entertainment trade publication The Hollywood Reporter) that will hold the Golden Globe Awards' intellectual property and oversee the "professionalization and modernization" of the ceremony, including "[increasing] the size and diversity of the available voters for the annual awards". The HFPA's philanthropic activities would continue separately as a non-profit entity. NBC then announced on September 20, 2022, that it has agreed to air the 80th Golden Globe Awards on January 10, 2023. The ceremony was moved to Tuesdays to avoid conflicting with the NFL (which had extended its regular season into January) and the College Football Playoff National Championship.

Categories

Motion picture awards
 Best Motion Picture – Drama: since 1943 (separated genre in 1951)
 Best Motion Picture – Musical or Comedy: since 1951
 Best Motion Picture – Foreign Language: since 1948
 Best Motion Picture – Animated: since 2006 
 Best Director – Motion Picture: since 1943
 Best Actor in a Motion Picture – Drama: since 1943 (separated genre in 1951)
 Best Actor in a Motion Picture – Musical or Comedy: since 1951
 Best Actress in a Motion Picture – Drama: since 1943 (separated genre in 1951)
 Best Actress in a Motion Picture – Musical or Comedy: since 1951
 Best Supporting Actor – Motion Picture: since 1943
 Best Supporting Actress – Motion Picture: since 1943
 Best Screenplay – Motion Picture: since 1947
 Best Original Score – Motion Picture: since 1947
 Best Original Song – Motion Picture: since 1961
 Cecil B. DeMille Award for Lifetime Achievement in Motion Pictures: since 1951

Television awards
 Best Television Series – Drama: since 1961
 Best Television Series – Musical or Comedy: since 1961
 Best Miniseries or Motion Picture – Television: since 1971
 Best Actor in a Television Series – Drama: since 1961
 Best Actor in a Television Series – Musical or Comedy: since 1961
 Best Actor in a Miniseries or Motion Picture – Television: since 1981
 Best Actress in a Television Series – Drama: since 1961
 Best Actress in a Television Series – Musical or Comedy: since 1961
 Best Actress in a Miniseries or Motion Picture – Television: since 1981
 Best Supporting Actor – Series, Miniseries or Motion Picture Made for Television: since 1970
 Best Supporting Actress – Series, Miniseries or Motion Picture Made for Television: since 1970
 Carol Burnett Award for Lifetime Achievement in Television: since 2018

Retired awards
 Best Documentary • Awarded from 1972 to 1976 
 Best English-Language Foreign Motion Picture • Awarded from 1957 to 1973
 New Star of the Year – Actor • Awarded from 1948 to 1983 
 New Star of the Year – Actress • Awarded from 1948 to 1983
 Henrietta Award (World Film Favorite – Female) • Awarded from 1950 to 1979
 Henrietta Award (World Film Favorite – Male) • Awarded from 1950 to 1979
 Promoting International Understanding • Awarded from 1945 to 1964
 Best Cinematography – Motion Picture • Awarded from 1948 to 1953, in 1955 and in 1963
 Special Award  – Juvenile Performance • Awarded in 1948, 1949, 1953 and 1959

Superlatives

Acting
In acting categories, Meryl Streep holds the record for the most competitive wins with eight, followed by Alan Alda, Angela Lansbury, Shirley MacLaine, Jack Nicholson who have six awards each. Behind them are Ed Asner, Carol Burnett, Laura Dern, Nicole Kidman, Jessica Lange, Rosalind Russell, and Kate Winslet with five.

At the 46th Golden Globe Awards an anomaly occurred: a three-way tie for Best Actress in a Motion Picture – Drama (Jodie Foster for The Accused, Shirley MacLaine for Madame Sousatzka, and Sigourney Weaver for Gorillas in the Mist).

Directing
In the category for Best Director, Elia Kazan leads with four wins, followed by Clint Eastwood, Miloš Forman, David Lean, Martin Scorsese, and Oliver Stone with three wins each. Steven Spielberg holds the record for most nominations with twelve. Francis Ford Coppola, Clint Eastwood, and Steven Soderbergh are the only directors to receive two nominations in the same year. Barbra Streisand is the first woman to have won the award.

Most awards
Barbra Streisand holds the record for most Golden Globes earned by an individual with ten awards, including with both competitive and honorary categories, followed by Tom Hanks, and Meryl Streep with nine awards each. Hanks winning as an actor and producer; all Streep wins were for acting; while Streisand prevails as an actress (3 times), composer, director, producer, as well as the non-competitive Henrietta Award (3 times). In addition, all three of them also received an honorary Cecil B. DeMille Award.

Most nominations
Meryl Streep also holds the record for most nominations with 32. Composer John Williams is second with 27.

Other
Two Acting Wins in Same Year
Only four people have won two acting awards in the same year:
Sigourney Weaver (1989)
Best Actress in a Motion Picture – Drama, Gorillas in the Mist
Best Supporting Actress in a Motion Picture, Working Girl
Joan Plowright (1993)
Best Supporting Actress in a Motion Picture Film, Enchanted April
Best Supporting Actress in a Series, Miniseries or TV Film, Stalin
Helen Mirren (2007)
Best Actress in a Motion Picture – Drama, The Queen
Best Actress in a Miniseries or Television Film, Elizabeth I
Kate Winslet (2009)
Best Actress in a Motion Picture – Drama, Revolutionary Road
Best Supporting Actress in a Motion Picture, The Reader
 Most awards won by a single film
 One film has won seven Golden Globe Awards.
 La La Land (2016)
 Two films have won six Golden Globe Awards.
 One Flew Over the Cuckoo's Nest (1975)
 Midnight Express (1978)
 Nine films have won five Golden Globe Awards.
 All the King's Men (1949)
 Lawrence of Arabia (1962)
 Doctor Zhivago (1965)
 The Graduate (1967) 
 Love Story (1970)
 The Godfather (1972)
 A Star Is Born (1976)
 Ordinary People (1980)
 Gandhi (1982)
 Most nominations received by a single film
 Nashville, with eleven nominations
 Cabaret, with nine nominations
 Highest Sweep (Winning every nominated category)
 La La Land won all seven Golden Globes that it was nominated for.
 One Flew Over the Cuckoo's Nest won all six of its nominations.
 Both A Star Is Born and Gandhi won all five that they were respectively nominated for.
 Most nominations without winning an award
 Motion Picture: Who's Afraid of Virginia Woolf?, Bonnie and Clyde, Guess Who's Coming to Dinner, Dog Day Afternoon, Foul Play, Ragtime and The Godfather Part III, all with seven nominations.
 Television: Will & Grace with 30 nominations. 
 Oldest person to win an award
 Ennio Morricone winning Best Original Score for The Hateful Eight (87 years old).
 Youngest person to win an award
 Ricky Schroder winning New Star of the Year – Actor for The Champ (9 years old).

Ratings

Notes

Criticism

Henry Gris resignation
Former HFPA president Henry Gris resigned from the board in 1958 claiming that "certain awards are being given more or less as  favors" with others querying why so many winners were represented by one public relations firm.

Pia Zadora awarded "New Star of the Year in a Motion Picture" in 1982
In 1982, Pia Zadora won a Golden Globe in the category "New Star of the Year in a Motion Picture" for her performance in Butterfly, over such competition as Elizabeth McGovern (Ragtime) and Kathleen Turner (Body Heat). Accusations were made that the Foreign Press Association members had been bought off. Zadora's husband, multimillionaire Meshulam Riklis, flew voting members to his casino, the Riviera Hotel in Las Vegas, which gave the appearance that they voted for Zadora to repay this. Riklis also invited voting members to his house for a lavish lunch and a showing of the film. He also spent a great deal on advertising. Furthermore, Zadora had made her film debut some 17 years earlier as a child performer in Santa Claus Conquers the Martians.

The Tourist for Best Musical/Comedy nominations in 2011
The nominations for the 2011 Golden Globes drew initial skepticism, as the Hollywood Foreign Press Association nominated The Tourist in its Best Musical/Comedy categories, even though it was originally advertised as a spy thriller, along with being one of the most panned films of the season.  Host Ricky Gervais even jokingly asked the main star of the film, Johnny Depp, if he had seen it. Rumors then surfaced that Sony, the distributor of The Tourist, had influenced Globes voters with an all-expenses-paid trip to Las Vegas, culminating in a concert by Cher.

Asian films excluded from Best Motion Picture categories
In 2020, the HFPA received widespread criticism for nominating Asian and Asian American films, such as The Farewell, Parasite and Minari, for Best Foreign Language Film while excluding them from the Best Motion Picture categories.  The decision to categorize Minari as a foreign language film, despite having an exclusively American production team and setting, was heavily condemned by many actors and filmmakers of Asian descent.  While HFPA rules stipulate that a film must have at least 50% English dialogue to be nominated for the Best Drama or Comedy/Musical categories, critics noted that the films Inglourious Basterds and Babel did not meet the 50% threshold but were still nominated for the Best Motion Picture categories, prompting accusations of anti-Asian racism.

See also
 List of American television awards
 List of film awards
 List of Golden Globe Awards ceremonies
 List of Golden Globe Award winners
 List of Golden Globe Award winning films
 List of Indian winners and nominees of the Golden Globe Awards

References

External links

 Official Golden Globes website
 Awards listing at Official Golden Globes website
 Awards listing at the IMDb

 
American film awards
American television awards
Awards established in 1944
Culture of Hollywood, Los Angeles
NBC original programming
TBS (American TV channel) original programming
Television series by Dick Clark Productions
1944 establishments in California